Patitiri is the capital town of the island of Alonnisos in the Sporades archipelago, Greece. It is located in the southern part of the island. The population in 2011 was 1,628. Patitiri was destroyed in the 1965 earthquake.

Population

References

Populated places in the Sporades